Lee Teng is a Singaporean television host. He is contracted with entertainment agency with Left Profile. Lee won the Top 10 Most Popular Male Artiste award and the Best Programme Host twice at the Star Awards. In 2017, he won an Asian Television Awards for Best Current Affairs Presenter category.

Early life
Lee was born in Taiwan and went to Singapore when he was nine. He studied primary school in Singapore. He graduated from Nanyang Technological University with a degree in accountancy.

Lee, however, did not serve his national duties in both conscription in Taiwan and National Service in Singapore despite having citizenship and permanent residency in both countries.

Media career
Lee was recruited by Mediacorp after winning the first runner-up in a talent show, SuperHost. He has since appeared on various variety shows and hosted some programmes, including the 2010, 2011, 2012, 2016, 2017 and 2018 Star Awards. Also, he is occasionally a guest deejay on Chinese language radio channel YES 933.

Lee has been accused of rigging votes during the 2015 Star Awards, in which Lee had asked his friend to design software for him to go online and repeatedly vote for himself, allegations which Lee denies.

Lee has gotten 5 out of 10 Top 10 Most Popular Male Artistes from 2013-2017 respectively.

Business career 
Lee co-owns a hair salon, Air Salon, located at The Cathay, with two business partners. The salon was converted into a salon-cum-cafe when they relocate the salon.

Personal life 
In 2018, Lee got into legal tussle with his business partner in court.

Lee began dating Gina Lin, a Singapore-based Taiwanese advertising executive, from October 2018, and then they were engaged on 24 March 2020. Lee announced his fiancee's pregnancy on 25 May 2020, but subsequently suffered a miscarriage. Lee and Lin registered their marriage in Singapore in June 2020.

Filmography

Television

Variety show 
 2006 Hey Hey Taxi 比比接車無比樂
 2006 PSC Nite 普威之夜
 2006 The 7-Eleven Game Show 7-Eleven抢先夺快争第一
 2006 Wanna Challenge 想挑戰嗎(外景)
 2007 Chinese New Year 101 溫故知新年
 2007 On The Beat II 都是大发现 II
 2007 Home Decor Survivor 3 摆家乐3
 2007 Super Train 遊學快車
 2008 Go Green 綠設兵團
 2008 Junior Home Decor Survivor 迷你擺家樂
 2009 都是大發現 4
 2009 泰自由
 2009 煮炒來咯
 2009 綜藝 GO LIVE
 2009 校園 Super Ster
 2009 偶像劇《愛就宅一起》見面會主持
 2010 新加坡國慶外景主持 Live
 2010 都是大發現 5
 2010 紅星大獎慶功宴
 2010 你在囧甚麼
 2010 紅星大獎星光大道
 2010 煮炒來咯 2
 2010 夢．窯匠
 2011 你在囧甚麼 2
 2011 紅星大獎慶功宴
 2011 明星志工隊 3
 2011 絕世好爸家人
 2011 K歌突擊隊
 2011 鐵路次文化
 2011 食品大贏家
 2011 第一屆新加坡電影節開幕主持
 2011 Sundown Festival戶外演唱會主持
 2011 新加坡跨年派對主持8频道 Live
 2012 林依晨KOSE代言宣傳活動主持
 2012 一心一德為善樂籌款晚會主持
 2012 IQ超人
 2012 紅星大獎慶功宴
 2012 你在囧甚麼 3
 2012 巨工廠
 2012 小毛病大問題
 2012 紅星大獎星光大道
 2012 新加坡戲劇《花樣人間》記者會主持
 2012 新加坡跨年派對主持8频道 Live
 2012 新加坡農曆新年晚會主持8頻道 Live
 2013 我的師傅是大廚
 2013 小毛病大問題
 2013 巨工廠2
 2013 至昨日的我
 2013 尋U先鋒

Compilation album

Accolades

References

External links
 Profile on xin.msn.com

1984 births
Living people
Victoria School, Singapore alumni
Victoria Junior College alumni
Nanyang Technological University alumni
Singaporean television personalities
Taiwanese emigrants to Singapore
Taiwanese television personalities